Amblytylus is a genus of plant bugs in the family Miridae. There are at least two described species in Amblytylus.

Species
 Amblytylus albidus (Hahn, 1834)
 Amblytylus nasutus (Kirschbaum, 1856)

References

Further reading

 
 
 

Phylinae
Cimicomorpha genera